Agajanian is an Armenian surname. Notable people with the surname include:

 Ben Agajanian (1919-2018), Armenian-American football player
 Cary Agajanian, one of the owners of the CURB/Agajanian/Beck Motorsports Indy Racing League team
 Dennis Agajanian, Christian musician known as one of the fastest flatpickers in the world
 J. C. Agajanian (1913-1984), Armenian-American motorsports promoter and race car owner

Armenian-language surnames